Łódź Lublinek (formerly Lublinek) is a small traffic railway station located on the outskirts of Łódź, Poland, in Polesie district, approx. 9 km from the city center and in the direct vicinity of Łódź Władysław Reymont Airport.

The station was created in the early 1940s by Germans as part of the wartime Program Otto, rebuilding the existing site of the railway crossing site into a pre-interchange stopping point. On the sides of mainline tracks two additional tracks were created, along with signalling control buildings and living quarters for personnel. During the war the station received the name Nertal (meaning The Valley of Ner). In 1951 the station received the name Lublinek, along with two narrow side platforms set between the tracks of the station, beginning its passenger service. Two additional tracks were built in the late 1970s.

The station serves ŁKA regional trains travelling from Łódź Kaliska station to Sieradz, and is a stopping point for freight trains, having 4 tracks for their needs. The only functioning branch line coming out of station serves an aggregate dump ramp located in Smulsko. An inactive branch track leads to a traction substation. Before the 1980s a branch line to a pottery plant was served by the station; currently the line is dismantled, and the only existing remains of it are rails crossing Maratońska street, located in parallel to the railway line, and a pavement following the earlier line of the tracks. The station is served by MPK Łódź bus line 68, running from Retkinia to Port Łódź shopping centre in Chocianowice (68A) or an intersection of Pabianicka and Dubois streets in Górna (68B).

Despite being incorporated into the city of Łódź in 1988, the station did not have the prefix "Łódź" in its name until 14. June 2020, when the current name was introduced after publishing the new timetable. From 2020 to 2021 the station went through capital reconstruction.

Train services
The station is served by the following services:

 InterRegio services (IR) Ostrów Wielkopolski — Łódź — Warszawa Główna
 InterRegio services (IR) Poznań Główny — Ostrów Wielkopolski — Łódź — Warszawa Główna
 Regiona services (PR) Łódź Kaliska — Ostrów Wielkopolski 
 Regional services (PR) Łódź Kaliska — Ostrów Wielkopolski — Poznań Główny

References 

Lublinek
Railway stations served by Łódzka Kolej Aglomeracyjna
Railway stations in Poland opened in 1941